Paddy Cahill (21 April 1977 – 9 April 2021) was an Irish filmmaker and cycling advocate. Most of his films are about Irish art and architecture.

Per his wishes, his funeral hearse was drawn by a bicycle.

Filmography
Amanda Coogan: Long Now 2017. Director.
Seán Hillen, Merging Views 2016. Director.

Awards
Best Short Documentary, 2016 Galway Film Fleadh, for Seán Hillen, Merging Views

References

External links
Official site

1977 births
2021 deaths
Irish filmmakers
Place of death missing
Place of birth missing